Adhiraj Gaur (born 30 August 1995), popularly known as Addy Raj, is an Indian actor, singer, model and former track athlete living in the Philippines. He was introduced in showbiz by ABS-CBN's I Love OPM in 2016. He later transferred to rival network GMA and was offered a lead role in the TV series Meant to Be, a romantic-comedy drama. He portrays the role of Jai Patel, an Indian suitor to Billie Bendiola (portrayed by Barbie Forteza), in the show.

Early life and career 
Addy was born in Ajmer, Rajasthan in India to Suchek Gaur and Anita Gaur. His father worked with the Government of India in the forest services for 40 years, retiring in 2019. His mother is a homemaker. He also has an older sister, Soumya Gaur, who runs a travel company based in Jaipur, Rajasthan known as Yaan Tours (yaantours.com) that specializes in organizing private tailor-made tours across India.

Addy studied in a prestigious boarding school in India known as Mayo College, from 2006 – 2011. It was here that he took a keen interest in sports and went on to become the Athletics Captain of his batch. He later featured in the list of 20 fastest runners of India and the fastest man of New Delhi in a 100m event in the year 2014. Apart from this, Addy was also a lead guitarist at his school band and continues to play even now in his free time.

Addy first arrived in the Philippines as an exchange student in Ateneo de Manila University, where he stayed for two months. He instantly fell in love with the country and upon finishing graduation back in India, decided to return to the Philippines to begin a career in showbiz. He soon started as a commercial model and was eventually discovered by ABS-CBN and appeared in a reality singing competition, “I Love OPM”. He later transferred to the rival network GMA and bagged one of the leading roles in the TV series, ‘Meant to Be’, a romantic –comedy drama where he played the role of Jai Patel, an Indian suitor to Billie Bendiola (portrayed by Barbie Forteza) in the show.

Following the success of Meant to Be, Addy was nominated for the 31st PMPC Star Awards for Television as the ‘Best New Male TV Personality’. He also made it to the list of ‘Top 10 Hottest Male Celebrities’ by Cosmopolitan Magazine and landed the cover page for Garage, MEGA Man and Yes magazine. He also went on to receive an endorsement for Bench, a popular clothing brand in the Philippines and formed an ‘Addycted Fansclub’, wherein his fans call themselves Addycted.

After his lead role in Meant to Be, Addy was seen in many of GMA Network’s television series including Sirkus, Kapag nahati ang puso, T.O.T.G.A, Super ma’am, One of the baes and Descendants of the sun. He also appeared in a variety of shows like Eat bulaga, Wowowin, Maynila, Daig kayo ng lola ko, Unang hirit, Sunday pinasaya, Dear uge, Celebrity bluff and Taste buddies.

After being an exclusive artist of GMA Network for 2 years, Addy was spotted in many other projects like the movie ‘The Panti Sisters’ (Black Sheep Productions), M.M.K. (ABS CBN), Hush (iWantTFC) as a freelance artist. He was also seen as the celebrity of the month for Playboy Philippines.

Addy proudly calls himself an ally of the LGBTQ+ community and is one of the only straight male actor who is very vocal about his views on straight people standing up for their LGBTQ+ friends. He has worked in collaboration with the Village Pipol magazine, San Miguel Light and has also participated in the Metro Manila Pride march for the same cause.

He says he loves Filipinos and would like to stay in the Philippines for the rest of his life.

Filmography

Television

Film

Accolades

See also 
 Ken Chan
 Jak Roberto
 Ivan Dorschner

References 

1995 births
Living people
Indian male models
People from Ajmer
Male actors from Rajasthan
GMA Network personalities
Star Magic
ABS-CBN personalities
Ateneo de Manila University alumni
Indian expatriates in the Philippines
Indian LGBT rights activists
Filipino LGBT rights activists